is a Japanese manga artist born in Tokyo, Japan.  Her most notable series is  Wedding Peach, which was made into an anime series of the same name, and was published worldwide. Since then she has worked on manga of all sorts, some of which have been released first in English and through ebooks. She is currently freelancing and teaching classes in manga.

Biography
One of Yazawa's earliest manga works was a dojinshi work called Itadaki! Panther which ran in a small monthly magazine called Pyon Pyon. Yazawa started with Shogakukan in 1990, during which she released Wedding Peach. Wedding Peach ran in  Ciao magazine from 1994 to 1996, published by Shogakukan for six tankōbon volumes, and was adapted into an anime series. She worked on several other stories until 2000.In 2003, she released the shojo manga Nozomi, a story about a girl who makes a wish upon a falling star and meets a demon who teaches her about love. It was the first manga she drew for English readers. She attended Anime Expo that year to promote Nozomi and Wedding Peach. In 2010, she released Mizuki through Digital Manga Publishing. The story is about a teenage girl who transforms into a devil whenever she gets angry and must fight a bevy of evil monsters. In 2011, she released Moon and Blood on Digital Manga Publishing in English prior to the Japanese release. Moon and Blood is about a teen vampire guy who stays with a family. In 2012, she begin teaching courses on how to make manga in Tokyo; this led to her creating online English courses as well as teaching overseas through Japan Foundation Toronto. In 2013, she published her autobiographical four-panel manga Go-Go Nao-P in English. She self-published the post-apocalyptic Shinku-Chitai (The Isolated Zone) manga which was picked up by a German monthly magazine .

Works

References

External links
 
 
 
 

Manga artists from Tokyo
People from Tokyo
Living people
Year of birth missing (living people)